The 1980 United States Senate election in Kansas took place on November 4, 1980. Incumbent Republican U.S. Senator Bob Dole was re-elected to his third term in office, after briefly campaigning for President earlier that year. He defeated Democrat John Simpson, who had previously served in the Kansas State Senate as a Republican.

Republican primary

Candidates 
 Bob Dole, incumbent Senator and nominee for Vice President in 1976
 Jim H. Grainge, resident of Lenexa

Results

Democratic primary

Candidates 
 John A. Barnes, candidate for U.S. Representative in 1976 from Cherryvale
 Howard C. Lee, resident of Ottawa
 James R. Maher, Conservative Party nominee for Senate in 1978 from Overland Park
 Ken North, resident of Shawnee Mission
 Ed Phillips, candidate for U.S. Representative in 1978 from Louisburg
 John Simpson, former Republican State Senator from Salina

Results

General election

Results

See also 
 List of United States senators from Kansas
 1980 United States Senate elections

Notes 

1980
Kansas
1980 Kansas elections
Bob Dole